José Medina (born 11 July 1942) is a Filipino sports shooter. He competed in the men's 50 metre rifle, prone event at the 1984 Summer Olympics.

References

1942 births
Living people
Filipino male sport shooters
Olympic shooters of the Philippines
Shooters at the 1984 Summer Olympics
Place of birth missing (living people)
Asian Games medalists in shooting
Shooters at the 1982 Asian Games
Asian Games bronze medalists for the Philippines
Medalists at the 1982 Asian Games
20th-century Filipino people